Nevermind: The Singles is a box set released by American grunge band Nirvana on November 25, 2011. It was released as a limited edition for Record Store Day 2011. The box contains the four commercially released singles from the band's Nevermind album on 10" vinyl. The release is limited to 5000 copies worldwide.

Track listing

"Smells Like Teen Spirit" single
 "Smells Like Teen Spirit"
 "Drain You"
 "Even in His Youth"
 "Aneurysm"

"Come as You Are" single
 "Come as You Are"
 "Endless, Nameless"
 "School" (live)
 "Drain You" (live)

"Lithium" single
 "Lithium"
 "Been a Son" (live)
 "Curmudgeon"
 "D-7" (John Peel BBC radio session)

"In Bloom" single
 "In Bloom"
 "Sliver" (live)
 "Polly" (live)

Charts

References

Nirvana (band) compilation albums
Universal Records compilation albums
Record Store Day releases
2011 compilation albums
B-side compilation albums
Albums produced by Butch Vig
Sub Pop compilation albums
Geffen Records compilation albums